Aleksandr Borisovich Ageyev (born 22 May 1996) is a Russian football player. He plays for FC Avangard Kursk.

Club career
He made his professional debut in the Russian Professional Football League for FC Krasnodar-2 on 10 April 2014 in a game against FC Mashuk-KMV Pyatigorsk.

He made his debut for the main squad of FC Krasnodar in the 2014–15 UEFA Europa League against Diósgyőri VTK on 7 August 2014. He also appeared in that season's Europa League group stage 1–0 away victory over Everton. He scored his first goal for the main squad on 25 September 2014 in a Russian Cup game against FC Sokol Saratov.

References

1996 births
People from Belgorod
Sportspeople from Belgorod Oblast
Living people
Russian footballers
Association football midfielders
FC Krasnodar players
FC Krasnodar-2 players
FC Energomash Belgorod players
FC Salyut Belgorod players
FC Avangard Kursk players
FC Tekstilshchik Ivanovo players
Russian First League players
Russian Second League players